Governmental leading high schools (Persian:دبیرستان نمونه دولتی) are Iranian schools in which the Ministry of Education of Iran grants a "model" license (in terms of superior education quality). These schools accept their students through an entrance exam and are governed by the government. Governmental leading high school in Secondary school in all fields accept students with an entrance exam. One of the benefits of Governmental Leading Schools is paying attention to students' talents and abilities, discovering them, and also reaching a point where students can be their best version.

Entrance exam 
The entrance exams for these schools are usually held at the end of each academic year and talented students with high IQ are accepted from the ninth grade to enter the tenth grade based on the test score. Passing the entrance exam of Governmental leading high schools requires high IQ, perseverance, strong skills and scientific support, and mastery of testing.

See also 
 Sampad

References

External links 

 Ministry of education Iran site  (in Persian)
 What kind of high school is governmental leading high school? (in Persian)

High schools in Iran